Daniela Galli, also known as Dhany (born 23 October 1972), is an Italian singer-songwriter. She is most known for her work with Benassi Bros. music project.

Discography

Studio albums
 Quiero Respirar (2000)
 E-Motions (2007)

Singles

As lead artist
1998 — "Dha Dha Tune"
1999 — "Quiero Respirar"
2000 — "Shut Up"
2006 — "Miles of Love"
2007 — "Let It Go"
2008 — "U & I"

As featured artist

Notes

External links
Official websites and public pages
 dhany.it — Dhany official website.  

1972 births
Trance singers
Italian dance musicians
Living people
21st-century Italian singers
21st-century Italian women singers